Flirtation (German: Liebelei) is a 1927 German silent drama film directed by Jacob Fleck and Luise Fleck and starring Fred Louis Lerch, Henry Stuart and Jaro Fürth. It was shot at the Johannisthal and EFA Studios in Berlin. The film's sets were designed by the art director Jacek Rotmil. It was based on a play by Arthur Schnitzler, which was turned into a 1933 sound film Liebelei by Max Ophüls.

Cast
 Fred Louis Lerch as Fritz Lobheimer, Student 
 Henry Stuart as Theodor Kaiser, sein Studienfreund 
 Jaro Fürth as Der alte Weyring, Cellist am Stadttheater 
 Evelyn Holt as Christine, seine Tochter 
 Hilde Maroff as Mizzi Schlager, ihre Freundin 
 Robert Scholz as Bankier Velten 
 Vivian Gibson as Doris, seine Frau 
 Karl Platen as Franz, Lobmeiers Diener

References

Bibliography
 Alfred Krautz. International directory of cinematographers, set- and costume designers in film, Volume 4. Saur, 1984.

External links

1927 films
Films of the Weimar Republic
Films directed by Jacob Fleck
Films directed by Luise Fleck
German silent feature films
German black-and-white films
Films based on works by Arthur Schnitzler
German films based on plays
German drama films
1927 drama films
Silent drama films
Films shot at Johannisthal Studios
Films shot at Halensee Studios
1920s German films
1920s German-language films